The Brown Hotel & Café is a historic building located at 114 North Range Avenue in Denham Springs, Louisiana.

Built in 1927 by Mr. William F. Brown, it is a two-story masonry Commercial Style building which served as the city principal and only hotel until its closure in 1955. The building was bought by former Denham Springs mayor Shelly O'Neal, which dismantled the interior after the purchase. In 1973 the building was purchased by Alex Theriot & Associates which used first floor as their engineering offices and leased the lower floor to printing companies. The lower floor was leased to Old Hotel Antiques in 1994. In 2000 the building was bought by Charles and Florence Crower, which operates Crower Antiques in the lower floor. The upper floor is leased for offices and storage. The original facade was restored to its pre-1955 look in 2006.

The building was listed on the National Register of Historic Places on October 6, 2015.

See also
 National Register of Historic Places listings in Livingston Parish, Louisiana

References

Commercial buildings on the National Register of Historic Places in Louisiana
Hotel buildings completed in 1927
Livingston Parish, Louisiana
National Register of Historic Places in Livingston Parish, Louisiana
1927 establishments in Louisiana
Chicago school architecture in the United States